Carondelet St. Joseph's Hospital, also known as St. Joseph's Hospital and Medical Center, is a private, for-profit, 449-bed acute-care hospital on the east side of Tucson, Arizona. St. Joseph's Hospital is a level 1 trauma center and is part of Carondelet Health Network, owned by Tenet Healthcare, and has sister hospitals in Arizona St. Mary's Hospital in Tucson, Marana Hospital in Marana and Holy Cross Hospital in Nogales.

The hospital provides services in the following specialties:
 Neurology
 Neurosurgery
Neuro Endovascular 
Cardiovacular
Orthopedics
Level 1 trauma
 Ophthalmology
 Maternity care
 Urology and Gynecology
 Neonatal Intensive Care
 Neuro Critical Care
 Outpatient Rehabilitation

History 
Founded in 1962, St. Josephs Hospital continues to meet the needs of Tucson's growing east side. Originally to be called St. Mary's Hospital East, St. Josephs Hospital has undergone many transformations. This includes the Regional Eye Center, Women's Pavilion, and North Americas most advanced Neurological Institute.

Utilization 

 18,474 Discharges
 81,081 Patient Days
 4.39 Average Length of Stay in days
 156,841 Outpatient Visits (Includes emergency visits and outpatient surgeries)
 77,563 ER Visits
 5,416 Inpatient Surgeries
 11,748 Outpatient Surgeries
 2,909 Newborn Births

References

Hospital buildings completed in 1962
Hospitals in Arizona
Buildings and structures in Tucson, Arizona
Christian hospitals